Giovanna Aldegani (born 7 December 1976) is an Italian archer. She competed in the women's individual and team events at the 1996 Summer Olympics.

References

1976 births
Living people
Italian female archers
Olympic archers of Italy
Archers at the 1996 Summer Olympics
Sportspeople from Venice
20th-century Italian women